China Perspectives is an academic quarterly launched in 1995 by the French Centre for Research on Contemporary China (CEFC) and published in Hong Kong. It is the English version of the French-language scientific journal created in 1992 by Michel Bonnin (Chief Editor from 1992 to 1998), Jean-Philippe Béja and Raphaël Jacquet. China Perspectives provides analysis of developments in the contemporary Chinese world (the PRC, Taiwan, Hong Kong and Macau) and uses an interdisciplinary approach.

Abstracting and indexing
This journal is indexed and abstracted in the following databases:
 Social Sciences Citation Index
 Current Contents - Social And Behavioral Sciences 
 Scopus 
 Academic Search Premier 
 International Bibliography of the Social Sciences 
 PAIS International 
 Worldwide Political Science Abstracts
 ERIH PLUS
 HCERES

Chief editors
1995-1999: Raphaël Jacquet
1999-2003: Eric Sautedé
2003-2006: Patricia Batto
2006-2010: Sébastien Billioud
2010-2013: Pierre-Henry De Bruyn
2013-2017: Séverine Arsène
2017- : Judith Audin

References

External links
 , 
 , 
 Centre d'études français sur la Chine contemporaine (CEFC) 

Chinese culture
Politics of China
Chinese studies journals
Quarterly journals